The Journal of Positive Psychology is a bimonthly peer-reviewed academic journal covering positive psychology, including measures of well-being such as life satisfaction, traits such as optimism, work life consequences of resilience, and methods to enhance positive psychological traits. It was established in 2006 and is published by Routledge. The editor-in-chief is Robert A. Emmons (University of California, Davis).

Abstracting and indexing 
The journal is abstracted and indexed in CINAHL, Current Contents/Social & Behavioral Sciences, PsycINFO, Scopus, and the Social Sciences Citation Index. According to the Journal Citation Reports, the journal has a 2020 impact factor of 4.197.

References

External links 
 

Positive psychology journals
Routledge academic journals
Publications established in 2006
Bimonthly journals
English-language journals